The 44th Indiana Infantry, an American Civil War regiment, was organized at Fort Wayne, Indiana, on October 24, 1861, with Hugh B. Reed, a Fort Wayne druggist, as colonel, and officially mustered in on November 22, 1861.  It was composed mostly of volunteers from what was then Indiana's Tenth Congressional District in the northeastern part of the state.  In December, the regiment left for Henderson, Kentucky.  It camped at Calhoun, Kentucky, until February 1862, when it moved to Fort Henry, Tennessee, then to Fort Donelson, Tennessee, where it participated in the siege of the fort, taking heavy casualties there.

The regiment was engaged both days, April 6–7, 1862, at the Battle of Shiloh, where it suffered 33 killed and 177 wounded. It participated in the Siege of Corinth, Mississippi, and fought at Stones River, Chickamauga and Missionary Ridge.  It was assigned provost (police) duty at Chattanooga, Tennessee, before being mustered out on September 14, 1865.

Frederick Dyer (see references) reports that the regiment's total combat fatalities were four officers and 76 enlisted men killed or mortally wounded, and nine officers and 220 enlisted men who died of disease.  The Indiana Chickamauga Commission (see references), however, reports the 44th's casualties as 350 killed and wounded in combat, and another 58 dead from disease.

One of the regiment's early casualties was William H. Cuppy, captain of Company E, paternal uncle of humorist Will Cuppy.  Severely wounded at Fort Donelson, he was sent home to South Whitley, Indiana, where he was cared for by his mother and sister until he died of his injuries in July 1862 at age 26.

Companies 
Below is a brief outline of the companies consisting of the 44th Indiana Infantry Regiment. This identifies the First Sergeants and Sergeants of each Company. One of the links in the External Links section below leads to a PDF that includes all soldiers for each company in its entirety, including those unassigned to a company but still in the 44th.

Company "A" 

 First Sergeant
 Marion B. Butler
Seymour Pugh Snyder
 Sergeants
 John Ulam
 William W. Wright
 James H. Merriman
 Joseph Milnes

Company "B" 
 First Sergeant
 James S. Getty
 Sergeants
 George R. Murray
 William McNeal
 Charles H. Ward
 William Eddy

Company "C" 
 First Sergeant
 Caleb Carman
 Sergeants
 Sedgewick Livingston
 John H. Strong
 William Riley
 J. R. McCool

Company "D" 
 First Sergeant
 Thomas C. Moffett
 Sergeants
 David K. Stoer
 George Shell
 Lafayette Perkins
 Owen T. James

Company "E" 
 First Sergeant
 George Sickafoose
 Sergeants
 Jerome F. Combs
 William Hilderbrand
 James Compton
 Henry Cray

Company "F" 
 First Sergeant
 Solomon Delong
 Sergeants
 John Gunsunhouser
 James H. Obell
 Wilson Nichols
 Nathan P. Fuller

Company "G" 
 First Sergeant
 B. F. Rawso
 Sergeants
 Phinneus M. Carey
 Lyman Blowers
 Neal Ruthvan
 Daniel Johnson
 Private
 Joseph Forest

Company "H" 
 First Sergeant
 Hiram F. King
 Sergeants
 David M. Hart
 John B. Rowe
 Daniel Rowe
 George M. Fish
 Private
 William Nelson Crow   Wounded 4/6/1862 Shiloh, TN

Company "I" 
 First Sergeant
 Nelson Mansfield
 Sergeants
 David S. Belknap
 Robert M. Wilmore
 Frank Launners
 Levi C. Vinson
 Privates
 William C. Welton
Cyrus Klapp

Company "K" 
 First Sergeant
 Norris S. Bennet
 Sergeants
 George W. Gordon
 Moses B. Willis
 Eugene S. Aldrich
 Samuel H. Elliott

See also

 List of Indiana Civil War regiments
 Indiana in the Civil War

References
Terrell, W.H.H. Report of the Adjutant General of the State of Indiana, (Vol. 2 pp. 438–40) Indianapolis: A. H. Connor, State Printer, 1865–69.
Dyer, Frederick Henry. A Compendium of the War of the Rebellion, Des Moines: Dyer Publishing Co. (1908).
Indiana Commissioners, Chickamauga National Military Park, Report of, Indiana at Chickamauga, Indianapolis: Sentinel Printing Co. (1900), pp. 187–190.

External links
 44thindiana.website has complete soldier list by company and other items of interest.
List of 44th Infantry Soldiers by Company(A through K, including unassigned)
Forty-Fourth Indiana Volunteer Infantry: History of its Services by John H. Rerick, M. D.
44th Indiana Regiment Association Records, 1861–1938, Collection Guide, Indiana Historical Society

44
Military units and formations established in 1861
1861 establishments in Indiana
Military units and formations disestablished in 1865